"I Ain't Superstitious" is a song written by bluesman Willie Dixon and first recorded by Howlin' Wolf in 1961.  It recounts various superstitions, including that of a black cat crossing the pathway.  The song has been recorded by a number of artists, including Jeff Beck, whose blues rock adaptation in 1968 was named one of Rolling Stone magazine's "100 Greatest Guitar Songs of All Time".

Original song
"I Ain't Superstitious" is a mid-tempo stop-time blues song that does not follow the typical chord progression. Musician and writer Bill Janovitz described it as "not merely an electric version of the blues practiced in the Delta; it is something wholly new, a more aggressive and sophisticated Chicago cousin that acknowledges contemporary jazz, R&B, and pop forms".

Howlin' Wolf recorded the song in Chicago in December 1961, with 
pianist Henry Gray,  guitarists Hubert Sumlin and Jimmy Rogers, drummer Sam Lay (drums), and with Willie Dixon on upright bass.  "I Ain't Superstitious" is included on several Howlin' Wolf compilation albums, including the 1969 Chess album Evil.

Jeff Beck version 
English rock guitarist Jeff Beck recorded "I Ain't Superstitious" for the 1968 debut album Truth featuring Rod Stewart on vocals.  Called "a well-known classic-rock-radio staple", Beck's version is "an inventive and inspired recording that manages to inject even more power into the updated arrangement".  The song's prominent feature is Beck's guitar work: "At every break, Beck's aqueous wah-wah tone makes his instrument sound like it's talking".  His version was ranked number 86 on Rolling Stones list of the "100 Greatest Guitar Songs of All Time".

 Megadeth version 

American thrash metal band Megadeth recorded the song for their 1986 album Peace Sells... but Who's Buying?. Although based on the Howlin' Wolf's original version, Megadeth's version reflects their thrash metal approach. According to group leader and singer Dave Mustaine:
"Willie Dixon heard our version and he goes, 'Man, I like it. I thought that was great'... Willie Dixon gave us the thumbs up."

 Personnel 
Production and performance credits are adapted from the album liner notes. MegadethDave Mustaine – guitars, lead vocals
David Ellefson – bass, backing vocals
Chris Poland – guitars
Gar Samuelson – drumsProductionDave Mustaine – production
Randy Burns – production, engineering
Casey McMackin – engineering
Paul Lani – mixing
Stan Katayama – mixing2004 remix and remaster'
Dave Mustaine – production, mixing
Ralph Patlan – engineering, mixing
Lance Dean – engineering, editing
Scott "Sarge" Harrison – editing
Tom Baker – mastering

Recognition
In 2017, Howlin' Wolf's original single version was inducted in to the Blues Hall of Fame as a "Classic of Blues Recording". The induction statement described it as "an ominous Willie Dixon composition" and noted the popularity of Beck's version with rock audiences.

References

1961 songs
Chess Records singles
Songs written by Willie Dixon
Howlin' Wolf songs
Jeff Beck songs
Blues songs